Greatest Hits (1985–1995) is a compilation album by American singer Michael Bolton, released in 1995. The album features Bolton's biggest hit singles from his four previous albums; The Hunger, Soul Provider, Time, Love & Tenderness and The One Thing, plus five new recordings. The album achieved a great deal of success, going 3× platinum in the US.

Track listing

Charts and certifications

Weekly charts

Year-end charts

Certifications

References

1995 greatest hits albums
Michael Bolton compilation albums
Columbia Records compilation albums